Gymnopilus parrumbalus is a species of mushroom in the family Hymenogastraceae.

See also

List of Gymnopilus species

External links
Gymnopilus parrumbalus at Index Fungorum

parrumbalus
Fungi of North America
Taxa named by Cheryl A. Grgurinovic